Van de Graaf, Van de Graaff or Van der Graaf imay refer to:

 Van de Graaff (crater), a lunar crater
 Van de Graaf (surname), includes a list of people with the surname and its variants
 Van de Graaff generator, an electrostatic generator
 Van der Graaf Generator, English progressive rock band
 Van de Graaff accelerator, a type of particle accelerator
 "Van Der Graaff", a song by British indie rock band The Courteeners